Elevate may refer to:

Music
 Elevate (Big Time Rush album), 2011
 Elevate (Morgan Page album), 2008
 Elevate (EP), a 2013 EP by Chamillionaire
 "Elevate" (Drake song), 2018
 "Elevate", a song by Alicia Keys from the album Here
 "Elevate", a song by DJ Khalil from the soundtrack album Spider-Man: Into the Spider-Verse
 "Elevate", a song by Papa Roach from the album Who Do You Trust?

Other uses
 Elevate, an air taxi service proposed by Uber
 Elevate Holdings, an American private air transportation company
 Elevate (organization), a youth-driven foster care program
 Elevate, the frequent-flyer program of Virgin America
 Elevate, a brain training mobile app
 Elevate, a Californian production company by Mikki Willis, most known for conspiracy videos Plandemic

See also
 Elevation (disambiguation)